"Go Away" is a song written by Stephony Smith, Cathy Majeski and Sunny Russ, and recorded by American country music artist Lorrie Morgan.  It was released in July 1997 as the first single from her album Shakin' Things Up.  The song reached #3 on the Billboard Hot Country Singles & Tracks chart in October 1997. This was Morgan's last top 10 hit on the Billboard Country charts.

Chart performance

Year-end charts

References

1997 singles
Songs written by Sunny Russ
Songs written by Stephony Smith
Lorrie Morgan songs
Song recordings produced by James Stroud
BNA Records singles
Songs written by Cathy Majeski
1997 songs